Pierre DesRuisseaux (7 July 1945 – 18 January 2016) was a Canadian poet. He was named the fourth Canadian Parliamentary Poet Laureate on April 28, 2009.

DesRuisseaux graduated with a degree in philosophy from the Université de Montréal. DesRuisseaux previously won the Governor General's Award for French language poetry in 1989 for his collection Monème. He was also nominated for the Governor General's Award for English to French translation in 1996 for Contre-taille, an anthology of translated poetry by English Canadian writers.

DesRuisseaux was born in Sherbrooke, Quebec. "His career-long fascination with Canada's literary traditions and history make him an excellent choice to engage us, as Canadians, in dialogue about the importance of verse in our national culture," Speaker of the Senate of Canada Noel Kinsella said about DesRuisseaux.

DesRuisseaux wrote the Livre des proverbes québécois and Dictionnaire des expressions québécoises, chosen by the Quebec Association for Intercultural Education as a work representative of Quebec's popular culture. On 18 January 2016, he died at the age of 70.

In 2017, it was revealed that in his volume of French language poetry, Tranches De Vie, DesRuisseaux had plagiarized a number of English language authors, including Maya Angelou, Dylan Thomas, Louis MacNeice, Charles Bukowski, Ted Kooser, and Tupac Shakur.  For some critics, the notion of plagiarism appears doubtful in this case.

References

External links
 Pierre DesRuisseaux at the Parliament of Canada website

1945 births
2016 deaths
20th-century Canadian poets
Canadian male poets
Governor General's Award-winning poets
Canadian Parliamentary Poets Laureate
Writers from Sherbrooke
21st-century Canadian poets
Canadian poets in French
20th-century Canadian translators
21st-century Canadian translators
20th-century Canadian male writers
21st-century Canadian male writers
Canadian male non-fiction writers